Gözükara may refer to one of several people:

 Kemal Gözükara (born 1928), Turkish mathematician, businessman and president of the Istanbul Arel University
 Özgür Gözükara (born 1976), Turkish chemist and Chairman of the Board of Trustees of Arel University Istanbul
 Mislina Gözükara (born 1997), Turkish women's football forward